Oocorys is a genus of large, deepwater sea snails, marine gastropod mollusk in the family Cassidae, the helmet snails and bonnet snails.

Species
Species within the genus Oocorys include:
 Oocorys clericus Quinn, 1980
 Oocorys elevata Dall, 1908
 Oocorys grandis Beu, 2008
 Oocorys sulcata  P. Fischer, 1884
 Oocorys verrillii (Dall, 1889)
Species brought into synonymy
 Oocorys barbouri Clench & Aguayo, 1939: synonym of Eucorys barbouri (Clench & Aguayo, 1939) (original combination)
 Oocorys bartschi Rehder, 1943: synonym of Eucorys bartschi (Rehder, 1943) (original combination)
 Oocorys morrisoni Kreipl & Alf, 2001: synonym of Oocorys verrillii (Dall, 1889)

References

 Nomenclator Zoologicus info

Cassidae